Mali Krš (Serbian Cyrillic: Мали крш) is a mountain in eastern Serbia. Its highest peak, Garvan, has an elevation of 929 metres above sea level. While not particularly rugged, Mali Krš is remote, hidden between nearby mountains of Liškovac, Veliki Krš and Homolje mountains. Like nearby Veliki Krš and Stol, Mali Krš is dominated by karst formations, and they are collectively known as "Gornjanski kras". Mali Krš has an elongated karst ridge at the top section.

References

External links
Species of Mali krš
Biking and photo tour through Gornjanski kras

Mountains of Serbia
Serbian Carpathians